Turkey River Mounds State Preserve is a historic site located near the unincorporated community of Millville, Iowa, United States. The  preserve contains thirty-eight of forty-three Native American mounds located on a narrow Paleozoic Plateau at the confluence of the Mississippi and Turkey rivers. There are also compound mounds in the preserve. The mounds were constructed during the Woodland period (500 BCE and 900 CE). They were used for burials and ceremonial places, and are now protected by law. The preserve is also home to a variety of trees, prairie grasses and flowers.

The mounds were first surveyed in 1885, and Ellison Orr studied them in the 1930s. People from Dubuque, Iowa bought the property in 1934 and gave it to the Iowa Conservation Commission in 1940. Other archaeological surveys were undertaken in 1964 and 1973. It was dedicated as a state preserve in 1968 for its archaeological, geological, and biological qualities. The preserve was listed on the National Register of Historic Places as a historic district in 1990.

References

Protected areas established in 1968
Mounds in Iowa
Iowa state preserves
Native American history of Iowa
Protected areas of Clayton County, Iowa
National Register of Historic Places in Clayton County, Iowa
Historic districts in Clayton County, Iowa
Historic districts on the National Register of Historic Places in Iowa
Archaeological sites on the National Register of Historic Places in Iowa
Protected areas on the Mississippi River
Woodland period
Driftless Area
Geoglyphs